Francesco Miccichè, also known as Franco Miccichè (born 15 May 1958), is an Italian politician and physician.

He served as assessor to safety and health policies during the term of mayor Lillo Firetto in Agrigento from 2015 to 2017. Miccichè was elected Mayor of Agrigento at the 2020 Italian local elections supported by a coalition of civic lists and took office on 21 October 2020.

See also
2020 Italian local elections
List of mayors of Agrigento

References

External links
 

1965 births
Living people
Mayors of Agrigento
University of Pisa alumni
University of Palermo alumni